The Lucille Lortel Awards recognize excellence in New York Off-Broadway theatre. The Awards are named for Lucille Lortel, an actress and theater producer, and have been awarded since 1986. They are produced by the League of Off-Broadway Theatres and Producers by special arrangement with the Lucille Lortel Foundation, with additional support from the Theatre Development Fund.

Other awards for off-Broadway theatre (although not necessarily exclusive to off-Broadway theatre) include the Drama League Award, Outer Critics Circle Awards, Drama Desk Awards and  the Obie Awards, as well as  the Henry Hewes Design Awards presented by the American Theatre Wing.

Voting committee
The voting committee is composed of representatives from the Off-Broadway League, Actors' Equity Association, Stage Directors & Choreographers Society, the Lucille Lortel Foundation, as well as theatre journalists, academics, and other Off-Broadway professionals.

Awards

The awards ceremony for the 2008–2009 season was held on May 3, 2009, at the Marriott Marquis Hotel (New York City); the nominations were announced on April 2.

The nominations for the 2009–2010 season were announced on April 1, 2010, and the winners were announced at a ceremony on May 2, 2010, held at Terminal 5 in New York City.

The nominations for the 2010–2011 season were announced on March 31, 2011, and the winners were announced on May 1, 2011, at the NYU Skirball Center, with hosts Zach Braff and Samantha Bee. Special Awards were given to Lynne Meadow (Lifetime Achievement Award); Gary Glaser (Service to Off-Broadway Award); Gatz – Produced by The Public Theater (Outstanding Alternative Theatrical Experience).

The nominees for the 2011–2012 season were announced on March 29, 2012; the award ceremony was held on May 6, 2012, at the Skirball Center with host Mario Cantone.  Special (non-competitive) awards were announced: Richard Frankel (Lifetime Achievement Award); Richard Foreman (Playwrights' Sidewalk Inductee); Fire Department of the City of New York (FDNY) (Service to Off-Broadway Award); and Voca People – Produced by Doron Lida, Revital Kalfo, Leeorna Solomons and Eva Price (Outstanding Alternative Theatrical Experience).

The awards for the 2012–2013 season were announced on May 5, 2013, with hosts Aasif Mandvi and Maura Tierney. Special Awards were presented to: Todd Haimes, Lifetime Achievement Award; Neil LaBute, Playwrights' Sidewalk Inductee; Theatre Development Fund, Outstanding Body of Work Award; and Old Hats by Bill Irwin and David Shiner, Outstanding Alternative Theatrical Experience.

The awards for the 2013–2014 season were announced on May 4, 2014, with hosts Megan Mullally and Nick Offerman. Special Awards were presented to: producer Robyn Goodman, Lifetime Achievement Award and Richard Nelson, Playwrights' Sidewalk Inductee.

The award nominations for the 2014–15 season were announced on April 2, 2015. Special Awards were given to Terrence McNally (Lifetime Achievement Award), Jeanine Tesori (Playwrights' Sidewalk Inductee) and general manager Nancy Nagel Gibb (Edith Oliver Service to Off-Broadway Award). The winners were announced on May 10, 2015, with Jesse Tyler Ferguson and Anna Chlumsky hosting.

Award categories
Awards are given in the following categories:

Outstanding Play
Outstanding Musical
Outstanding Solo Show
Outstanding Revival
Outstanding Director
Outstanding Choreographer
Outstanding Lead Actor in a Play
Outstanding Lead Actress in a Play
Outstanding Lead Actor in a Musical
Outstanding Lead Actress in a Musical
Outstanding Featured Actor in a Play
Outstanding Featured Actress in a Play
Outstanding Featured Actor in a Musical
Outstanding Featured Actress in a Musical
Outstanding Scenic Design
Outstanding Costume Design
Outstanding Lighting Design
Outstanding Sound Design
Outstanding Projection Design (permanently added 2017)

Award winners in key categories

Outstanding Play 

 2022: English
 2020: Heroes of the Fourth Turning
 2019: Pass Over
 2018: Cost of Living and School Girls; Or, the African Mean Girls Play 
 2017: Oslo
 2016: Guards at the Taj
 2015: Between Riverside and Crazy
 2014: Bad Jews
 2013: The Whale
 2012: Sons of the Prophet
 2011: The Elaborate Entrance of Chad Deity
 2010: The Orphans' Home Cycle
 2009: Ruined
 2008: Betrayed
 2007: Stuff Happens
 2006: The Lieutenant of Inishmore
 2005: Doubt
 2004: Bug
 2003: Take Me Out
 2002: Metamorphoses
 2001: Proof
 2000: Dinner With Friends
 1999: Wit
 1998: Gross Indecency: The Three Trials of Oscar Wilde
 1997: How I Learned to Drive
 1996: Molly Sweeney
 1995: Camping with Henry & Tom
 1994: Three Tall Women
 1993: The Destiny of Me
 1992: Lips Together, Teeth Apart
 1991: Aristocrats
 1989: The Cocktail Hour
 1987: The Common Pursuit

Outstanding Musical 

 2022: Kimberly Akimbo
 2020: Octet
 2019: Rags Parkland Sings the Songs of the Future
 2018: KPOP
 2017: The Band's Visit
 2016: FUTURITY
 2015: Hamilton
 2014: Fun Home
 2013: Dogfight
 2012: Once
 2011: Bloody Bloody Andrew Jackson
 2010: The Scottsboro Boys
 2009: Fela! A New Musical
 2008: Adding Machine
 2007: In the Heights and Spring Awakening
 2006: The Seven
 2005: The 25th Annual Putnam County Spelling Bee
 2004: Caroline, or Change
 2003: Avenue Q
 2002: Urinetown
 2001: Bat Boy: The musical
 2000: James Joyce’s The Dead
 1997: Violet
 1996: Floyd Collins
 1995: Jelly Roll!
 1994: Wings
 1993: Forbidden Broadway
 1992: And the World Goes Round…
 1991: Falsettoland

2010s

Outstanding Lifetime Achievement (non-competitive)

Until the 2014 awards, the Lead Actor/Actress and Featured Actor/Actress awards encompassed both plays and musicals. The categories were split beginning in 2014.

See also
Drama Desk Award
Drama League Award
Tony Awards

References

External links

 List of winners and nominees

Culture of New York City
Off-Broadway
American theater awards
Awards established in 1986
1986 establishments in New York City
Awards for projection designers